The Tuma MTE 224 VA is a machine pistol of Swiss origin and is manufactured by Solothurn.

Characteristics
Tuma MTE 224 VA is chambered in the 5.56x23mm calibre. Its components are made from chrome nickel-molybdenum steel and 'space technology' type alloys.

Users

External links
 Photographs

Machine pistols
5.56 mm firearms
Firearms of Switzerland